Juke box - Urli d'amore is a 1959 "musicarello" (musical comedy film), directed by Mauro Morassi. The film stars Mario Carotenuto and the singers Mina and Adriano Celentano.

Plot
Mario, a little slacker who thrives on his wits, has just been released from prison after serving a sentence for scam. Always looking for a way to make ends meet without working by taking advantage of the gullibility of others, he meets Marisa, a mature woman, owner of a record company. Marisa, although she soon realizes who she is dealing with, despite everything, she falls in love with him and is even willing to marry him. To strengthen her intention, the woman decides to impose the blocking of the wedding on her employees: in fact, no one will be able to marry until she is married. The fact is that among the employees there are some couples who have already fixed their wedding day...

Cast
Mario Carotenuto as Mario
Marisa Merlini as Marisa
Mario Girotti as Otello
Raffaele Pisu as Orlando
Aroldo Tieri as the accountant Anzillotto
Aldo Giuffrè as Bruno
Tiberio Murgia as Calogero
Mara Berni as Domenica
Tiberio Mitri as Kid la tigre
Fedele Gentile as brigadiere
Ciccio Barbi as singer
Adriano Celentano as singer
Mina as singer
Giorgio Gaber as singer
Grazia Maria Spina
Pina Gallini
Karin Baal Otello's girlfriend
Gordana Miletic 	
Dori Dorika (Dorika Dory) as Franchina
Wanda Ibba as singer
Coleen Hicks as singer
Leopoldo Valentini
Jacqueline Derval
Germano Longo

Censorship 
When Juke box urli d'amore was first released in Italy in 1959 the Committee for the Theatrical Review of the Italian Ministry of Cultural Heritage and Activities rated it as VM16: not suitable for children under 16. In addition the committee imposed the following revisions: 1) the scene in which “Diva del Varietà” appears, half-undressed, and she displays the back of her body wiggling her hips obscenely; 2) the scene in which Anzilotto attempts to rape Elsa; 3) the scene in which Rosa appears on the bed wearing a negligee with her legs excessively uncovered. The official document number is: 31287, it was signed on 17 November 1959 by Minister Domenico Magrì.

References

Bibliography
 Rondolino, Gianni (1967). "Catalogo Bolaffi del Cinema italiano 1956/1965". Torino: Bolaffi.

External links
 

1959 films
Musicarelli
1959 musical comedy films
1950s Italian films